Dombey was an unincorporated community in Wood County, West Virginia, United States.

The name is, perhaps derived from the novel Dombey and Son by Charles Dickens.

References 

Unincorporated communities in West Virginia
Unincorporated communities in Wood County, West Virginia